O'Neill Point is the north point of Lautaro Island, lying 1.5 nautical miles (2.8 km) west-southwest of Lemaire Island in Gerlache Strait. Named by United Kingdom Antarctic Place-Names Committee (UK-APC) in 1977 for Vincent Michael O'Neill, Falkland Islands Dependencies Survey (FIDS) radio operator and mechanic at Danco Island, 1957–58, and Deception Island, 1958–59.

Headlands of Graham Land
Danco Coast